Chenchu language is a Dravidian language which belongs to the Telugu branch of its South-Central family. This language is spoken mostly in Andhra Pradesh and Telangana states in India by about 28,754 people (1981 census) of the Chenchu Aboriginal forests hunter-gatherer tribe. It is also called Chenchukulam, Chenchwar, Chenswar or Choncharu.

References

Dravidian languages
Agglutinative languages